Dynjandisheiði is a mountain pass in the Westfjords region of Iceland that runs between Arnarfjörður and Barðaströnd. The road was built over the pass in 1959 and was the first car-accessible road to Ísafjörður and the first connection between Ísafjörður and Barðaströnd. The pass is flat and snowy compared to the region as a whole.

Proposed infrastructure 

The Icelandic Road Administration has plans for a tunnel under Dynjandisheiði that would be  in length.

There have also been proposals to build a second road over the pass.

External links 

 Vegur um Dynjandisheiði (in Icelandic)

References 

Westfjords